An electrostatic analyzer or ESA is an instrument used in ion optics that employs an electric field to allow the passage of only those ions or electrons that have a given specific energy. It usually also focuses these particles (concentrates them) into a smaller area. ESA’s are typically used as components of space instrumentation, to limit the scanning (sensing) energy range and, thereby also, the range of particles targeted for detection and scientific measurement. The closest analogue in photon optics is a filter.

Radial cylindrical analyzer
Electrostatic analyzers are designed in different configurations. A simple version is a radial cylindrical analyzer, which consists of two curved parallel plates at different potentials. Ions or electrons enter the analyzer at one end and either pass through the other end or collide with the walls of the analyzer, depending on their initial energy. In these types of analyzers, only the radial component of the velocity of a charged particle is changed by an ESA since the potential on the plates only varies in the radial direction if one considers the geometry in cylindrical coordinates. Poisson's Equation can be then used to calculate the magnitude of the electric field pointing radially inwards. The resultant inward-pointing force generated by this electric field will cause the particles' trajectories to curve in a uniform circular motion. Depending on initial energy (velocity), only certain particles will therefore have the "correct" motion to exit the analyzer by tracing its physical structure, while others will collide into the walls of the instrument. In addition to the energy, the angle of entry will also affect the particles' time-of-flight through the analyzer as well as exit angle. In practice, the plates are usually oppositely charged and at very high potentials. Also, the inner surface of the analyzer, usually made of aluminum for space missions, is sometimes plated with black chrome or even Ebonol C to absorb stray light, instead of allowing it to bounce its way through.

Face-field cylindrical energy analyzer
The Face-Field Cylindrical Energy Analyzer is a very new class of electrostatic cylindrical energy analyzers. It uses a cylindrical field, restricted by concentric cylindrical electrodes and two flat electrodes perpendicular to the axis of symmetry. The inner electrode is usually connected with the flat electrodes, and the outer one, which is electrically isolated, has an electric potential that can either be constant or variable. (Potential is negative (-) for an electron beam, and positive (+) for a positive-ion beam.)  The focusing field becomes very different from that of the simple-cylinder type (such as in the well-known CMA) near the flat-face boundaries; namely, it can achieve a very high energy resolution for a beam entering through the entrance window in one of the face electrodes. This new class of analyzer can be used in a variety of applications. It do remote sensing such as measuring the flow of charged particles in space; e.g., scanning-electron/Auger-electron spectroscopy for analyzing large objects.

ESAs are usually designed and analyzed using an off-the-shelf ion-optics simulation-software package, such as SimIon, which includes the capability of performing Monte Carlo simulations on known test particles, thus providing the designer a better understanding of the response characteristics of the analyzer itself.

Use in space instrumentation

Examples of space instruments or missions using Electrostatic Analyzers:
 The CAPS (Cassini Plasma Spectrometer) instrument on the Cassini-Huygens spacecraft
 IBEX-Hi and IBEX-Lo instruments on the Interstellar Boundary Explorer spacecraft
 Mariner 10
 The SWAP (Solar Wind Analyser around Pluto) instrument on the New Horizons spacecraft
 Pioneer 6, 7, and 8 missions
 Ranger 1 
 THEMIS mission
 The ASPERA-3 and ASPERA-4 IMA instruments onboard Mars Express and Venus Express
 The ICA and IES ion and electron instruments on board the ESA/Rosetta mission 
 The SWIA, SWEA and STATIC instruments on MAVEN. STATIC includes a time-of-flight measurement to obtain the mass/charge ratio in addition to its electrostatic analyzer.
 Jovian Auroral Distributions Experiment (JADE) on the Juno (spacecraft) Jupiter orbiter
 Solar Probe ANalyzer (SPAN) on board the Parker Solar Probe Mission
 Solar Wind and Pickup Ions (SWAPI) instrument aboard the Interstellar Mapping & Acceleration Probe (IMAP) spacecraft scheduled for launch in 2025.

See also
 Ion Optics

References

Electrostatics